Hypsotropa punctinervella is a species of snout moth in the genus Hypsotropa. It was first described by George Hampson in 1918 and is known to be found in Sri Lanka.

References

Moths described in 1918
Taxa named by George Hampson
Anerastiini